Friedrich Maria Urban (born Friedrich Johann Victor Urban, 28 December 1878, Brünn, Austro-Hungarian Empire – 4 May 1964, Paris) was a psychologist from the Austro-Hungarian Empire, known for the introduction of probability weightings used in experimental psychology.

Biography
Friedrich Johann Victor Urban was born into a German-speaking family in the Austro-Hungarian empire. He adopted the name "Friedrich Maria" as a pen name and his published articles appear under the name "F. M. Urban". He was a Gymnasium graduate in Brünn in 1897 and received his Promotion (Ph.D.) in philosophy from the University of Vienna in 1902. He did research and studied probability under Wilhelm Wirth in Leipzig. He taught psychological acoustics at Harvard University from February 1904 to November 1905. He was a Fellow for Research in Psychology at the University of Pennsylvania from 1905 to 1908.

In 1914 Urban returned to Brünn and married Adele Königsgarten (born 1884), who was Jewish. At the outbreak of WW I, he and his wife moved to Sweden, where he did research from 1914 to 1917 at the Swedish Academy of Sciences. In 1917 he returned to Brünn and served in the Austrian army. Brünn was transferred to the sovereignty of the Czechoslovak Republic in 1919. Because his fluency in Czech was inadequate for an academic post, from 1919 he worked as a statistician for an insurance company, but continued to publish papers on psychometry and psychophysics. Urban and his Jewish wife stayed in Brünn throughout WW II, although they sent their two daughters abroad. At the end of WW II, he was put into a concentration camp by the Soviet Red Army and then by the Soviet-controlled Czechoslovakian regime. He was released owing to pleas from foreign colleagues, but he was forced in 1948 to leave Czechoslovakia. He and his wife joined their elder daughter in Norway and then lived in Brazil from 1949 to 1952 where he lectured at the University of São Paulo on factor analysis. In 1952 Urban and his wife went to live with their younger daughter in France, living first in Toulon and then Maisons-Laffitte near Paris.

In 1911 he was elected a Fellow of the American Association for the Advancement of Science. He was an Invited Speaker of the ICM in 1928 in Bologna.

Müller-Urban weights
Müller-Urban weights are based on techniques introduced by G. E. Müller in 1904 and by F. M. Urban in 1912.

Contemporary psychologists have replaced Müller-Urban weights with newer statistical procedures.

Selected publications
with R. M. Yerkes: "Time-Estimation in its Relations to Sex, Age, and Physiological Rhythms." in Harvard Psychological Studies vol. 2 (1906): 405–430.
The application of statistical methods to the problems of psychophysics. No. 3. Psychological Clinic Press, 1908.
"The method of constant stimuli and its generalizations." Psychological Review 17, no. 4 (1910): 229–259.
"The future of psychophysics." Psychological Review 37, no. 2 (1930): 93–106. 
"The Weber-Fechner law and mental measurement." Journal of Experimental Psychology 16, no. 2 (1933): 221–238. 
 "The method of equal appearing intervals." Psychometrika 4, no. 2 (1939): 117–131.

References

1878 births
1964 deaths

Fellows of the American Association for the Advancement of Science
Psychologists from the Austro-Hungarian Empire
Harvard University staff
University of Pennsylvania staff
Austro-Hungarian expatriates in the United States
Expatriates from the Austro-Hungarian Empire in Sweden
Czechoslovak statisticians
Czechoslovak expatriates in France
Czechoslovak expatriates in Brazil